This is a list of wars, armed conflicts and rebellions involving the Commonwealth of Australia (1901 – present) and its predecessor colonies, the colonies of New South Wales (1788–1901), Van Diemen's Land (1825–1856), Tasmania (1856–1901), Victoria (1851–1901), Swan River (1829–1832), Western Australia (1832–1901), South Australia (1836–1901), Queensland (1859–1901). Dates indicate the years in which Australia was involved in the war. Notable militarised interstate disputes are included. For a list of wars that have been fought on the Australian mainland and in Australian waters, see the list of conflicts in Australia.

Colonial Australia (1788–1901) 
Colonial Australia refers to the Commonwealth of Australia's predecessor colonies, the colonies of New South Wales (1788–1901), Van Diemen's Land (1825–1856), Tasmania (1856–1901), Victoria (1851–1901), Swan River (1829–1832), Western Australia (1832–1901), South Australia (1836–1901), Queensland (1859–1901) and there territories and islands.

Commonwealth of Australia (1901–present)

See also 

 Military history of Australia
 Australian military involvement in peacekeeping

Notes

References 

Sources:

 

 
Australia
Wars
Wars